The Ven. Richard Hughes (1881–1962) was the Archdeacon of Bangor from 1947 to 1957.

Morgan was educated at the University of London and Ripon College Cuddesdon and ordained in 1905.  After  curacies in Llanbeblig he held incumbencies in Dolwyddelan, Machynlleth and Holyhead.
 
He died on 26 October 1962.

References

1881 births
Alumni of the University of London
Alumni of Ripon College Cuddesdon
Archdeacons of Bangor
1962 deaths